United Nations Security Council Resolution 2064 was unanimously adopted on 30 August 2012.

See also 
List of United Nations Security Council Resolutions 2001 to 2100

References

External links
Text of the Resolution at undocs.org

 2064
 2064
2012 in Lebanon
August 2012 events